Rectoris longifinus is a species of cyprinid in the genus Rectoris. It inhabits China and is considered harmless to humans.

References

Cyprinid fish of Asia
Freshwater fish of China